The Lost Cosmonauts or Phantom Cosmonauts are subjects of a conspiracy theory, which alleges 
that Soviet and Russian space authorities have concealed the deaths of some  cosmonauts in outer space. Proponents of the Lost Cosmonauts theory argue that the Soviet Union attempted to launch human spaceflights before Yuri Gagarin's first spaceflight, and that cosmonauts onboard died in those attempts. Soviet military pilot Vladimir Ilyushin was alleged to have landed off course and been held by the Chinese government. The Government of the Soviet Union supposedly suppressed this information, to prevent bad publicity during the height of the Cold War.

The evidence cited to support Lost Cosmonaut theories is generally regarded as inconclusive, and several cases have been confirmed as hoaxes. In the 1980s, American journalist James Oberg researched space-related disasters in the Soviet Union, but found no evidence of these Lost Cosmonauts. Since the fall of the Soviet Union in the early 1990s, much previously restricted information has been made available, including information on Valentin Bondarenko, a would-be cosmonaut, whose death during training on Earth was covered up by the Soviet government. Even with the availability of published Soviet archival material and memoirs of Russian space pioneers, no evidence has emerged to support the Lost Cosmonaut theories. Ilyushin, who died in 2010, also never gave any support to conspiracy theories.

Allegations

Purported Czechoslovakian information leak
In December 1959, an alleged high-ranking Czechoslovakian Communist leaked information about many purported unofficial space shots. Alexei Ledovsky was mentioned as being launched inside a converted R-5A rocket. Three more names of alleged cosmonauts claimed to have perished under similar circumstances were Andrei Mitkov, Sergei Shiborin and Maria Gromova. In December 1959, the Italian news agency Continentale  repeated the claims that a series of cosmonaut deaths on suborbital flights had been revealed by a high-ranking Czechoslovakian communist. Continentale identified the cosmonauts as Alexei Ledowsky, Serenty Schriborin, Andrei Mitkow, and Maria Gromova.  No other evidence of Soviet sub-orbital crewed flights ever came to light.

High-altitude equipment tests
A 1959 edition of Ogoniok published an article and photos of three high-altitude parachutists: Colonel Pyotr Dolgov, Ivan Kachur, and Alexey Grachov. Official records state that Dolgov was killed on November 1, 1962, while carrying out a high-altitude parachute jump from a Volga balloon gondola. The helmet visor of Dolgov's Sokol space suit hit part of the gondola as he exited, depressurizing the suit and killing him. Kachur is known to have disappeared around this time; his name has become linked to this equipment. Grachov is thought to have been involved, with Dolgov and Kachur, in testing the high-altitude equipment. Russian journalist Yaroslav Golovanov suggested that high-altitude testing was exaggerated into a story that those parachutists died on a space flight. In late 1959, Ogoniok carried pictures of a man identified as Gennady Zavadovsky testing high-altitude equipment (perhaps with Grachov and others). Zavadovsky would later appear on lists of dead cosmonauts, without a date of death or accident description.  

Yaroslav Golovanov, who researched the lost cosmonaut claims in his book, "Cosmonaut #1", found and interviewed the real Alexey Timofeyevich Belokonov, a retired high-altitude parachutist. In this interview, Belokonov revealed more about his colleagues Dolgov, Kachur, Mikhailov, Grachov, Zavadovsky and Ilyushin, and confirmed they never flew to space. According to Belokonov, in 1963, after New York Journal American published an article on lost cosmonauts, listing the parachutists among them, Soviet newspapers Izvestia and Krasnaya Zvezda published a refutation that included testimonies and photographs of the actual parachutists Belokonov, Kachur, Grachov and Zavadovsky. The parachutists also wrote an angry letter to New York Journal American editor William Randolph Hearst, Jr., which he ignored.

Robert Heinlein
In 1960, science fiction author Robert A. Heinlein wrote in his article Pravda means 'Truth (reprinted in Expanded Universe) that on May 15, 1960, while traveling in Vilnius, in the Soviet Lithuania, he was told by Red Army cadets that the Soviet Union had launched a human into orbit that day, but later the same day, it was denied by officials. Heinlein speculated that Korabl-Sputnik 1 was an orbital launch, later said to be uncrewed, and that the retro-rockets had fired in the wrong attitude, making recovery efforts unsuccessful.

According to Gagarin's biography, these rumours were likely started as a result of two Vostok missions equipped with dummies (Ivan Ivanovich) and human voice tape recordings (to test if the radio worked) that were made just prior to Gagarin's flight.

In a U.S. press conference on February 23, 1962, colonel Barney Oldfield revealed that an uncrewed space capsule had indeed been orbiting the Earth since 1960, as it had become jammed into its booster rocket. According to the NASA NSSDC Master Catalog, Korabl Sputnik 1, designated at the time 1KP or Vostok 1P, did launch on May 15, 1960 (one year before Gagarin). It was a prototype of the later Zenit and Vostok launch vehicles. The onboard TDU (Braking Engine Unit) had ordered the retrorockets to fire to recover, but due to a malfunction of the attitude control system, the spacecraft was oriented upside-down, and the firing put the craft into a higher orbit. The re-entry capsule lacked a heat shield as there were no plans to recover it. Engineers had planned to use the vessel's telemetry data to determine if the guidance system had functioned correctly, so recovery was unnecessary.

The Torre Bert recordings

Vladimir Ilyushin

Moon-shot allegations
The Soviet Union lost the crewed Moon-landing phase of the space race to the United States. However, some sources claim that just before the historic Apollo 11 flight to the Moon, the Soviets undertook an adventurous attempt to beat the Americans. Despite the unsuccessful first test launch of the new Soviet N1 rocket on 20 January 1969, it is alleged that a decision was made to send a crewed Soyuz 7K-L3 craft to the Moon using an N1. This attempt is alleged to have occurred on 3 July 1969, when it ended in an explosion, destroying the launch pad and killing the cosmonauts on board. Official sources state that the L3 was not ready for crewed missions. Its lunar lander, the LK, had been tested a few times but its orbiter, the 7K-LOK, had not been successfully tested by the closing of the Moon-landing program at the end of 1974. The closing of the program was officially denied and maintained top secret until 1990 when the government allowed them to be published under the policy of glasnost.

This claim correlates with the late hoax about the unsuccessful Moon-shot flight of Andrei Mikoyan. However, in reality, the second launch, like the first, was a test of the booster and was therefore uncrewed.  Even if cosmonauts had been on board, they would have been rescued by its launch escape system, which carried the dummy payload to safety  from the pad.

Other allegations 
In 1959, pioneering space theoretician Hermann Oberth claimed that a pilot had been killed on a sub-orbital ballistic flight from Kapustin Yar in early 1958. He provided no source for the story.

Confirmed hoaxes

Ivan Istochnikov
Officially Soyuz 2 was an uncrewed spacecraft that was the docking target for Soyuz 3. However, Mike Arena, an American journalist, allegedly found in 1993 that an 'Ivan Istochnikov' and his dog 'Kloka', who were manning Soyuz 2, disappeared on October 26, 1968, with signs of having been hit by a meteorite. They had been "erased" from history by the Soviet authorities, who could not tolerate such a failure.<ref name="El Mundo">Ivan Istochnikov: El cosmonauta fantasma, El Mundo Magazine, May 25, 1997. Following the links, we find the announcement of the Fontcuberta exposition.</ref>

The entire story was found to be a hoax perpetrated by Joan Fontcuberta as a 'modern art exercise' that included falsified mission artifacts, various digitally manipulated images, and immensely detailed feature-length biographies that turned out to be riddled with hundreds of historical as well as technical errors. The exhibit was shown in Madrid in 1997 and the National Museum of Catalan Art in 1998. Brown University later purchased several articles, and put them on display themselves.

Mexico's Luna Cornea magazine however, failed to notice this, and ran issue number 14 (January/April 1998) with photos, and a story explaining the "truth".

Andrei Mikoyan
Andrei Mikoyan was reportedly killed together with a second crew member in an attempt to reach the Moon ahead of the Americans in early 1969. Due to system malfunction, they failed to get into lunar orbit and shot past the Moon.

This story, which circulated in 2000, may have been based on the plot of an episode of the television series The Cape. The episode "Buried in Peace" first aired on October 28, 1996. In it, a Space Shuttle crew on a mission to repair a communications satellite encounters a derelict Soviet spacecraft with a dead crew—the result of a secret attempt to beat the United States to the Moon in the 1960s. Tom Nowicki played Major Andrei Mikoyan, a Russian member of the Space Shuttle crew in the story.

Later allusions

 While the 1964 U.S. edition of the Guinness Book of World Records credits Gagarin's Vostok 1 as "earliest successful manned satellite", a footnote names nine putative lost cosmonauts: eight mentioned above (Ledovsky, Schiborin, Mitkov, Belokonev, Kachur, Grachev, Dolgov, and Ilyushin) and Gennadiy Mikhailov (named by the Judica-Cordiglia brothers).
 Julius Epstein wrote several papers on "Soviet failures in Space", including allegations of lost cosmonauts, which were read into the Congressional Record in 1965 and 1971.
 The May 1987 issue #121 (page 74–79) of Dragon Magazine features "Operation: Zodiac", an article by Merle M. Rasmussen, creator of the Top Secret role-playing game, Jackie Rasmussen & Roger E. Moore, a follow on to "Operation: Zenith" which appeared in issue 120, this includes the scenario "Code Name: Cancer", wherein a space shuttle crew is sent to rendezvous with a Soviet Cosmos satellite launched in 1963, they discover that the satellite was in fact a modified Vostok designed to deliver a nuclear payload; the cosmonaut aboard died when his life support system was exhausted following a launch into a higher than planned orbit.
 The July 1987 issue #123 (pp. 82–86) of Dragon Magazine features the article "Operation: Zondraker, Part 2", also by Rasmussen, which includes the scenario "Code Name: Starfall", wherein a team of agents explores the site of the failed Luna 15 lander, discovering that it was a crewed mission, with two cosmonauts; one died instantly in the crash (identified as Nikolai L. Kuzmin), while the other, unidentified, cosmonaut died later as his oxygen supply ran out.
 A 1989 installment of Philip Bond's "Wired World", published in the UK comics anthology Deadline magazine, features a cosmonaut who crash-lands in a London park where the main characters are picnicking.
 Victor Pelevin's anti-Soviet 1992 novel Omon Ra is based on depictions of Soviet space flights as a planned homicide. Some of these "flights" are also not really flights, but fakes for the sake of Soviet propaganda.
 In 1993, Sun, a U.S. supermarket tabloid, ran a story recounting multiple cosmonaut deaths and ensuing body recovery missions between 1968 and 1988. 
 The 2004 video game Metal Gear Solid 3: Snake Eater has a boss known as The Fury who was a cosmonaut sent into space before Gagarin, and whose spacecraft was engulfed in flames upon re-entry. He survived with severe burns and a newly-found sense of pyromania; his boss fight consequently involves the use of fire.
 The 2005 mockumentary First on the Moon describes the preparations and training for a Soviet moonshot in 1938, as well as the following cover-up.
 The 2007 Jed Mercurio novel Ascent features a cosmonaut who makes a successful – albeit suicidal – moon landing ahead of the Apollo landings.
 In 2010 the Canadian band Wolf Parade released a song titled "Yulia", which lead singer Dan Boeckner confirmed in an interview as recounting a lost cosmonaut.
 In the 2010 video game No More Heroes 2: Desperate Struggle, Travis Touchdown duels with Captain Vladimir, a ghostly cosmonaut with telekinetic powers who commands a laser-firing satellite named Volk.
 The 2011 science fiction / horror film Apollo 18, which depicts a secret lunar mission by NASA in 1974, depicts astronauts discovering a Soviet cosmonaut who was killed by spider-like aliens hidden on the Moon along with an LK lander.
 In the 2014 short film Kosmonauta, USSR cosmonauts on a secret space mission are lost in space and killed by debris, with a lone survivor sending a distress signal back to earth.
 Michael Cassutt's book Red Moon features a cosmonaut named Shiborin who flew on two space flights; one of the early Lost Cosmonaut stories was of an ill-fated suborbital mission in 1958 prior to Gagarin's flight supposedly crewed by a Serenti Shiborin.
 The 2019 Apple TV+ series For All Mankind takes place in an alternate history wherein the alleged 3 Jun 1969 N1 launch was successful and resulted in the Soviet Union winning the race for the moon.

See also
 List of spaceflight-related accidents and incidents

References

Inline citations

General references
 Encyclopedia Astronautica: Phantom cosmonauts
 James Oberg (1988). Uncovering Soviet Disasters: Exploring the Limits of Glasnost, Random House, 
 Yaroslav Golovanov Cosmonaut #1'', Izvestia, 1986.
 Pavel Toufar, 2002–2003, Kruty vesmir, Akcent, 58–258
 Pavel Toufar, 2001, Vzestup a pad Jurije Gagarina, Regia, 
 Alexander Zheleznyakov, Gagarin was still the first (same in Russian)
 Komsomolskaya pravda newspaper (in Russian)
 A.Pervushin "Terrible secret" of soviet space (in Russian)
 Uchitelskaya gazeta (in Russian)
 Ren-TV story (in Russian)

External links
 Phantom cosmonauts. Encyclopedia Astronautica
 Oberg chapter on Dead Cosmonauts
 The Lost Cosmonauts web site with the audio recordings
 The Lost Cosmonauts web site archived from 2018
 

Conspiracy theories in Europe
Crewed space program of the Soviet Union
Pseudohistory